The Republic of Alto Perú was an unrecognized state formed in 1828 after a revolt led by Pedro Blanco Soto and José Ramón de Loayza Pacheco as a consequence of the 1828 Peruvian–Bolivian War.

History

Because of Gamarra's non-intervention policy in Bolivia, Blanco Soto and Loayza Pacheco revolted in September 1828, with the latter declaring the independence of the La Paz Department under the name of the Republic of Alto Perú. Despite this limited control, it claimed the entirety of the Bolivian state. This forced the convening of a new assembly that met in the department of Chuquisaca in the Convention of December 1828, composed for the most part of supporters of Gamarra, who appointed Blanco president and the now general Loayza vice president on 26 December.

However, the measures adopted by his new government were not to the liking of the Bolivian military leadership, especially the one headed by José Ballivián, a Bolivian nationalist. 5 days later he deposed Blanco, and on December 31, 1828, the Blanco's government was overthrown when the president was preparing to go to a mass in full dress. Ballivián arrested Vice President Loayza at the entrance of the National Palace. Blanco Soto tried to hide in a latrine but was also captured and with his arm in a sling he was transferred prisoner to the Recoleta convent where he would be killed by the guard that guarded him on January 1, 1829. With the death of Blanco Soto and the arrest of Loayza, the ill-fated Republic of Alto Perú also would come to an end.

See also
 Gran Colombia–Peru War

References

Former countries in South America
1828 in Bolivia